The 1961 Oregon Webfoots football team represented the University of Oregon during the 1961 NCAA University Division football season. In their eleventh season under head coach Len Casanova and third as an independent, the Webfoots compiled a 4–6 record and outscored their opponents 152 to 112. Three home games were played on campus at Hayward Field in Eugene, with two at Multnomah Stadium in Portland.

The team's statistical leaders included Doug Post with 662 passing yards, Mel Renfro with 335 rushing yards, and Paul Burleson with 222 receiving yards.
All three were sophomores.

Schedule

Roster
 E   Paul Burleson, So.
HB Mike Gaechter, Sr.
QB Mike Post, So.
HB Mel Renfro, So.

References

External links
 Game program: Oregon at Washington State – November 11, 1961
 WSU Libraries: Game video – Oregon at Washington State – November 11, 1961

Oregon
Oregon Ducks football seasons
Oregon Webfoots football